This is the discography of German rapper and songwriter Sabrina Setlur.

Albums

Studio albums

Compilation albums

Singles

As lead artist

As featured performer

References

External links 
 

Sethur, Sabrina